Falling Up is the ninth and final studio album from Falling Up. They released the album on November 13, 2015.

Critical reception

Awarding the album a perfect five-star rating at Jesus Freak Hideout, David Craft states, "Truthfully, this album is unmarketable, at least from a traditional standpoint...Only a band such as Falling Up could get away with this kind of game-winning Hail Mary" Christopher Smith, giving the album four and a half stars from Jesus Freak Hideout, writes, "On Falling Up's self-titled final album, lead singer Jessy Ribordy's delicate, emotional vocals are paired with stunningly beautiful and dynamic experimental rock landscapes to create an otherworldly musical experience" Rating the album four and a half stars for New Release Today, Jonathan J. Francesco describes, "This bittersweet goodbye is a triumphant finale to one of Christian music's true high art bands, and I'm proud to have been a fan."

Scott Fryberger, indicating in a four and a half star review by Jesus Freak Hideout, replies, "[he] can't recommend this album enough." Signaling in a five star review at Jesus Freak Hideout, Wayne Reimer recognizes, "Losing Falling Up is an emotional blow for [him], personally, but they went out in a glorious blaze of flares." Mark Rice, allocating four and a half stars to the album from Jesus Freak Hideout, responds, "this is the type of album that you cannot listen to multiple times without noticing something ingenious each time that you had failed to notice before."

Track listing

Personnel
Falling Up
 Jessy Ribordy – vocals, guitar, piano, keyboards
 Daniel Elder – guitar, backing vocals
 Nick Lambert – guitar
 Jeremy Miller – bass guitar, keyboards
 Josh Shroy – drums, percussion

References

2015 albums
Falling Up (band) albums